Kamalabad (also Romanized as Kamālābād; also known as Kermamakand, Kharmam Kand, Khermāmākand, Khermameh Kand, Kher Mameh Kand, and Kheyr Mameh Kandī) is a village in Hajjilar-e Shomali Rural District, Hajjilar District, Chaypareh County, West Azerbaijan Province, Iran. At the 2006 census, its population was 380, in 79 families.

References 

Populated places in Chaypareh County